Lester J. "Butch" Leitl (August 19, 1899 – October 14, 1980) was an American college football player and coach. He served as the head football coach at the University of Wisconsin–Platteville from 1927 to 1963, compiling a record of 88–99–15.

Leitl was inducted into the University of Wisconsin–Oshkosh athletics Hall of Fame in 1975 as an athlete.  He died on October 14, 1980, at a hospital in Dubuque, Iowa.

References

1899 births
1980 deaths
American football tackles
Basketball coaches from Wisconsin
Wisconsin Badgers football players
Wisconsin–Oshkosh Titans football players
Wisconsin–Platteville Pioneers athletic directors
Wisconsin–Platteville Pioneers football coaches
Wisconsin–Platteville Pioneers men's basketball coaches
People from Sturgeon Bay, Wisconsin